Gerhard Schmidt (26 December 1901 – 30 April 1981) was a German-born physician and biochemist who was regarded as "a world authority on nucleic acids and phospholipids."

Career

Life in Germany
He was born in Stuttgart, where his father Julius Schmidt was a professor of chemistry at the University of Stuttgart. He studied medicine at the University of Tübingen and the Goethe University Frankfurt, and earned a doctorate at the Goethe University under the supervision of the university's then-rector Gustav Embden in 1926. He then worked as a research assistant and as a Privatdozent at the Goethe University's department of biochemistry and at the Senckenberg Institute of Pathology, where he was a collaborator and protégé of the institute's director and rector of the Goethe University Bernhard Fischer-Wasels. Following the Nazi takeover of Germany, he immediately faced persecution due to his Jewish background. Herman Kalckar notes:

Refugee and life in the United States
Schmidt spent the next two years as a refugee in Italy and Sweden, where he worked at the University of Naples, the University of Stockholm and the University of Florence.

In 1935 he received a Carnegie Foundation Research Fellowship for Displaced German Scholars at Queen's University at Kingston in Canada. In 1937 he joined the Rockefeller Institute for Medical Research in New York City and the following year the Washington University School of Medicine. In 1940 he became a research associate at the Tufts University School of Medicine where he spent the rest of his career, from 1948 as a research professor and from 1955 as a professor of biochemistry.

He "made a ground-breaking discovery regarding the development of nucleic acid metabolism, introducing a quantitative method for determining DNA and RNA in tissues. The simplicity and reliability of the method continues to play an important role in molecular biology research."

He became a member of the National Academy of Sciences in 1976.

References

German biochemists
American biochemists
1901 births
1981 deaths
Goethe University Frankfurt alumni
Academic staff of Goethe University Frankfurt
Tufts University faculty
Jewish emigrants from Nazi Germany to the United States
Members of the United States National Academy of Sciences